The Glengarth Sevens was an annual 7 a-side rugby union tournament held at Davenport Rugby Club  The first Glengarth Sevens was held in 1967 at Headlands Road, home of Davenport Rugby Club.  Its celebrated its 21st anniversary in 1987 which was to be the last Glengarth Sevens held at Davenport rugby club.

How it all began 
In June 1966 the North East Cheshire Society for Mentally Handicapped Children opened their day care centre at 'Glengarth' in Station Road, Marple, Stockport.  As a number of the children who attended lived in Bramhall, a Bramhall sub-committee of the society was formed with one of its main objectives being fundraising.  It was thought best to organise events which would be annual to raise regular income.  At the time, a member of the Bramhall sub-Committee, Michael Hodgson, was Captain of Davenport Rugby Club.

The club was approached through, then President Norman Harris, by George Jackson and Michael Hodgson with the properstioion of organising an annual seven a side rugby competition.  George had a ready made carrot to dangle in that he said he could get David Watkins, then of Newport RFC and the 'Prince of all Sevens Players' to bring a side for the first tournament.  It was decided to form a joint committee to organise the event and so the 'Glengarth Sevens' was born.

England Rugby International, Eric Evans was invited to become President and remained throughout providing continuous encouragement, inspiration and leadership.  The England players of his era rated Eric as the finest Captain they had played under and the team went on to win the Grand Slam in 1957 and Triple Crown in 1958.

The tournament was very fortunate to have a number of dedicated sponsors but the most valuable contribution was made by Davenport Rugby Club and its members who worked so hard to make the Glengarth Sevens a national success and a very highly respected seven a side rugby tournament.  The 21 years of the Glengarth Sevens raised more than £60,000.

Many famous teams and players entered the Glengarth Sevens.  Players like David Watkins, Andy Irvine, Les Cusworth, Phil Bennett, Peter Winterbottom, Steve Smith, Fran Cotton and many others; teams like Orrell, who won the competition 8 times and guest sides such as the Public School Wanderers, who won it 4 times.  Famous memories include legendary British and Irish Lions Captain, Willie John McBride running onto the Davenport 1st XV pitch with a lion cub from Longleat.

Previous winners of the Glengarth Sevens 
Main Event
1967 - David Watkins Seven
1968 - Loughborough University
1969 - Croeso '69
1970 - Loughborough University
1971 - Orrell 
1972 - Orrell 
1973 - Public School Wanderers
1974 - Orrell 
1975 - Orrell 
1976 - Orrell 
1977 - Sale
1978 - Welsh Select Seven
1979 - Public School Wanderers
1980 - Orrell 
1981 - Orrell 
1982 - Blackheath
1983 - Public School Wanderers
1984 - Public School Wanderers
1985 - Orrell 
1986 - Waterloo

Davenport Plate
1967 - St. Helens
1968 - Sale
1969 - Wilmslow
1970 - Wilmslow
1971 - Middlesbrough
1972 - St. Helens
1973 - Lymm
1974 - Manchester
1975 - Wakefield
1976 - Fylde
1977 - Wilmslow
1978 - Anti-Assassins
1979 - Orrell 
1980 - Public School Wanderers
1981 - Public School Wanderers
1982 - Public School Wanderers
1983 - Blackheath
1984 - Selkirk
1985 - Sale
1986 - Harlequins

Glengarth Reborn 
Stockport Rugby Club are recreating the Glengarth sevens atmosphere in June 2012 with the first ever 'Stockport 7s'.  Over the weekend of the 2 and 3 June there will be a Men's tournament, where the Glengarth Cup and Davenport Plate will be presented, and a Women's tournament.  There will also be a beer festival and live music and evening entertainment.  Just like the first Glengarth tournament in 1967, a committee has been formed and the memories are flooding back.  More information is available at stockport7s.com

External links 
   Stockport 7s Website

Rugby sevens competitions in England